French Protestants may refer to:

 Protestantism in France
 Huguenots
 Taizé Community